Tuolumne County, officially the County of Tuolumne, is a county located in the U.S. state of California. As of the 2020 census, the population was 55,620. The county seat and only incorporated city is Sonora.

Tuolumne County comprises the Sonora, CA Micropolitan Statistical Area. The county is in the Sierra Nevada region.

The northern half of Yosemite National Park is located in the eastern part of the county.

Etymology
The name Tuolumne is of Native American origin and has been given different meanings, such as Many Stone Houses, The Land of Mountain Lions, and Straight Up Steep, the latter an interpretation of William Fuller, a native Chief. Mariano Vallejo, in his report to the first California State Legislature, said that the word is "a corruption of the Native American word talmalamne which signifies 'cluster of stone wigwams.'" The name may mean "people who dwell in stone houses," i.e., in caves.

History
Tuolumne County Boundaries 

One of California's original 27 counties, Tuolumne was organized in 1850.

Prior to the official naming of counties by the state, Tuolumne was sometimes referred to as Oro County.

The original lines of Tuolumne County were not long established. In 1854 and 1855 the portion of Tuolumne County that extended west into the San Joaquin Valley was reorganized as Stanislaus County.
In 1864 a number of the original counties including Tuolumne contributed lands that would lead to the establishment of Alpine County to the northeast. With the State's Adoption of the Political Code in 1872
the current boundaries of Tuolumne County were largely established as shown in the maps below.

Geography
A California Department of Forestry document reports Tuolumne County's  include federal lands such as Yosemite National Park, Stanislaus National Forest, Bureau of Land Management lands, and Indian reservations. Notable landforms in the county include Table Mountain.

Special Districts
Special districts in Tuolumne County include:
 Belleview Elementary School District
 Big Oak Flat-Groveland Unified School District
 Chinese Camp Elementary School District
 Columbia Fire District
 Columbia Union Elementary School District
 Curtis Creek Elementary School District
 Groveland Community Services District
 Jamestown Elementary School District
 Jamestown Fire District
 Mi-Wuk Sugar Pine Fire Protection District
 Sonora Elementary School District
 Sonora Union High School District
 Soulsbyville Elementary School District
 Strawberry Fire District
 Summerville Elementary School District
 Summerville Union High School District
 Tuolumne County Air Pollution Control District
 Tuolumne County Water District No. 1
 Tuolumne Fire District
 Tuolumne Regional Water District
 Tuolumne Utilities District
 Twain Harte Fire District
 Twain Harte-Long Barn Union Elementary School District
 Yosemite Community College District

Adjacent counties
 Alpine County, California - north
 Calaveras County, California - northwest
 Stanislaus County, California - southwest
 Mariposa County, California - south
 Madera County, California - southeast
 Mono County, California - east
 Merced County, California - southwest

Geographical features 
Environmental
 Red Hills (Tuolumne County) (Area of Critical Environmental Concern)
 Stanislaus National Forest (National protected area, part)
 Yosemite National Park (NPA, part)

Valleys
 Grand Canyon of the Tuolumne
 Lone Gulch
 Tiltill Valley

Transportation

Major highways
 California State Route 49
 California State Route 108
 California State Route 120

Public transportation
Tuolumne County Transit bus routes radiate from Sonora to serve most of the county. In Columbia, a connection can be made to Calaveras County Transit. There is no public transportation into or out of Tuolumne County that connects to any of the closest metropolitan areas.

Yosemite Area Regional Transportation System (YARTS) makes a single daily round trip from Sonora into Yosemite Valley during the summer months.

Airports
Columbia Airport and Pine Mountain Lake Airport are both general aviation airports located in the Southwest and Northeast corners of the county respectively.

Crime 

The following table includes the number of incidents reported and the rate per 1,000 persons for each type of offense.

Cities by population and crime rates

Demographics

2020 census

Note: the US Census treats Hispanic/Latino as an ethnic category. This table excludes Latinos from the racial categories and assigns them to a separate category. Hispanics/Latinos can be of any race.

2011

Places by population, race, and income

2010 Census
The 2010 United States Census reported that Tuolumne County had a population of 55,365. The racial makeup of Tuolumne County was 48,274 (87.2%) White, 1,143 (2.1%) African American, 1,039 (1.9%) Native American, 572 (1.0%) Asian, 76 (0.1%) Pacific Islander, 2,238 (4.0%) from other races, and 2,023 (3.7%) from two or more races.  Hispanic or Latino of any race were 5,918 persons (10.7%).

2000

As of the census of 2000, there were 54,501 people, 21,004 households, and 14,240 families residing in the county.  The population density was 9/km2 (24/mi2).  There were 28,336 housing units at an average density of 5/km2 (13/mi2).  The racial makeup of the county was 89.5% White, 2.1% Black or African American, 1.8% Native American, 0.7% Asian, 0.2% Pacific Islander, 2.9% from other races, and 2.8% from two or more races.  8.2% of the population were Hispanic or Latino of any race. 94.7% spoke English and 3.5% Spanish as their first language.

There were 21,004 households, out of which 26.1% had children under the age of 18 living with them, 54.4% were married couples living together, 9.6% had a female householder with no husband present, and 32.2% were non-families. 26.0% of all households were made up of individuals, and 11.70% had someone living alone who was 65 years of age or older.  The average household size was 2.36 and the average family size was 2.82.

In the county, the population was spread out, with 20.7% under the age of 18, 7.6% from 18 to 24, 25.3% from 25 to 44, 27.9% from 45 to 64, and 18.5% who were 65 years of age or older.  The median age was 43 years. For every 100 females there were 111.50 males.  For every 100 females age 18 and over, there were 112.20 males.

The median income for a household in the county was $38,725, and the median income for a family was $44,327. Males had a median income of $35,373 versus $25,805 for females. The per capita income for the county was $21,015.  About 8.1% of families and 11.4% of the population were below the poverty line, including 16.2% of those under age 18 and 4.0% of those age 65 or over.

Government and policing
The Government of Tuolumne County is established and defined by the California Constitution and is a five-member elected Board Of Supervisors who serve four year elected terms. The government provides services such as elections and voter registration, law enforcement, jails, vital records, property records, tax collection, public health, and social services. The Board is government for all unincorporated areas.  Sonora is the only incorporated city in Tuolumne County.

Sheriff
The Tuolumne County Sheriff provides court protection, jail administration, and coroner services for the entire county. It provides patrol and detective services for the unincorporated areas of the county.

Politics

Voter registration statistics

Cities by population and voter registration

Overview 
Tuolumne county tends to vote Republican in Presidential and congressional elections. The last Democrat to win the county was Bill Clinton in 1992. In the 2008 presidential election, 14,988 votes were counted for John McCain with former president Barack Obama receiving 11,532 votes.

  
  
  
  
  
  
  
  
  
  
  
  
  
  
  
  
  
  
  
  
  
  
  
  
  
  
  
  
  
  
  

In the state legislature Tuolumne is in the 5th Assembly district, which is held by Republican Frank Bigelow, and the 8th Senate district, which is held by Republican Andreas Borgeas.

Communities

City
Sonora (county seat)

Census-designated places

Cedar Ridge
Chinese Camp
Cold Springs
Columbia
East Sonora
Groveland
Jamestown
Long Barn
Mi-Wuk Village
Mono Vista
Phoenix Lake
Pine Mountain Lake
Sierra Village
Soulsbyville
Strawberry
Tuolumne
Tuttletown
Twain Harte

Unincorporated communities

Blanchard
Buchanan
Bumblebee
Confidence
Dardanelle
Deadwood
Mather
Moccasin
Pinecrest
Priest
Standard

Population ranking
The population ranking of the following table is based on the 2010 census of Tuolumne County.

† county seat

See also 
National Register of Historic Places listings in Tuolumne County, California

Explanatory notes

References

Further reading
 A Memorial and Biographical History of the Counties of Merced, Stanislaus, Calaveras, Tuolumne and Mariposa, California. Chicago: Lewis Publishing Co., 1892.
 "Tuolumne-Calaveras Unit: 2005 Pre-Fire Management Plan, September 28, 2005 Edition," California Department of Forestry and Fire Protection, 09-28-2005, pp. 16.
 US Department of Education, National Center for Education Statistics.
 CNN News, "Local and National Election Results - Election Center 2008", CNN News, November, 2008.

External links

 
 Tuolumne County Economic Development Authority's Web Site

 

 
1850 establishments in California
California counties
Populated places established in 1850